Kaeng Tana National Park is in Khong Chiam District in Ubon Ratchathani Province, northeastern Thailand. It is on the Mun River. It was established on 13 July 1981 and is an IUCN Category II protected area.

Geography
The park is 50,000 rai ~  in size. The park is highland and is watered by the Mun and Khong Rivers. The average elevation is about 200 meters. The park is characterized by plateaux and undulating hills. The highest peak, Ban Tad, stands at 543 meters.

Flora and fauna
The park is covered by deciduous forest, which has dwarf Shorea obtusa, Shorea siamensis, and Dipterocarpus obtusifollus. There are some dry evergreen forests around Huay (stream) and Don (prominence) Tana. Main plants are Eugenia cumini, Pterocarpus macrocarpus, Xylia kerril, teak, grassland, and bamboo. Wildlife includes wild pigs, barking deer, civet, macaque, gibbon, birds, and fishes.

Sights
Kaeng Tana (แก่งตะนะ) - The largest rapids of the Mun River. In the middle of the rapids, there is a huge sandstone boulder splitting the river into two streams, and a concrete block built during the French colonial era to identify a channel for cruising.
Tham Phra or Tham Phu Ma Nai (ถ้ำพระหรือถ้ำภูหมาไน) - A stone inscription and Lingam base or "Yoni" from the 7th-8th century  were found. Now the original stone inscription is kept in the National Museum, Ubon Ratchathani.
Namtok Rak Sai Nature Trail (เส้นทางศึกษาธรรมชาติน้ำตกรากไทร) - The trail lines the cliff by the Mun River,  from the park headquarters. It runs by the cliff for  through various kinds of flora, such as lichens, mosses, and ferns.
Namtok Tat Ton (น้ำตกตาดโตน) - The waterfall is on Highway 2173, off Highway 217 .

See also
List of national parks of Thailand
List of Protected Areas Regional Offices of Thailand

References

External links
Trekthailand

National parks of Thailand
Geography of Ubon Ratchathani province
IUCN Category II
Tourist attractions in Ubon Ratchathani province
Protected areas established in 1981
1981 establishments in Thailand